Edgar (Eddie) Manning (1889 or 1890 – 8 February 1931), was a Jamaican jazz musician and criminal who became known as the "dope-king" of 1920s London.

Manning was born in Jamaica but had settled in London by 1916.

See also
Brilliant Chang

References

External links
http://www.oxforddnb.com/view/article/75563

19th-century births
1931 deaths
Jamaican criminals